Victor Tyrone Jones (born December 5, 1967) is a former American football running back who played five seasons in the National Football League with the Houston Oilers, Denver Broncos, Pittsburgh Steelers and Kansas City Chiefs. Jones played college football and wrestled at Louisiana State University. He attended Zachary High School in Zachary, Louisiana.

References

External links
Just Sports Stats
College stats

Living people
1967 births
Players of American football from Baton Rouge, Louisiana
American football running backs
African-American players of American football
LSU Tigers football players
LSU Tigers wrestlers
Houston Oilers players
Denver Broncos players
Pittsburgh Steelers players
Kansas City Chiefs players
21st-century African-American people
20th-century African-American sportspeople